Campsomeriella is a genus of the family Scoliidae, also known as the scoliid wasps. They are generally parasites of beetle larvae, most often of Scarabaeidae.

Species List
Campsomeriella agilis (Smith, 1859)
Campsomeriella annulata (Fabricius, 1793)
Campsomeriella annulata sakaguchii (Uchida, 1933)
Campsomeriella burmeisteri (Betrem, 1928)
Campsomeriella caelebs (Sichel, 1864)
Campsomeriella cameroni (Betrem, 1928)
Campsomeriella collaris (Fabricius, 1775)
Campsomeriella collaris insularis (Gupta & Jonathan, 2003)
Campsomeriella collaris quadrifasciata (Fabricius, 1798)
Campsomeriella cultrata (Kirby, 1894)
Campsomeriella dimidiatipennis (Saussure, 1855)
Campsomeriella fax (Bradley, 1936)
Campsomeriella hirticollis (Fabricius, 1804)
Campsomeriella hirticollis bemsteini (Betrem, 1928)
Campsomeriella hirticollis diversipennis (Gribodo, 1893)
Campsomeriella hirticollis micans (Guerin, 1830)
Campsomeriella hirticollis problematica (Betrem, 1928)
Campsomeriella ilanensis (Tsuneki, 1972)
Campsomeriella kiogaensis (Betrem, 1972)
Campsomeriella litoralis (Krombein, 1995)
Campsomeriella madonensis (Buysson, 1910)
Campsomeriella madonensis transvaalensis (Cameron, 1910)
Campsomeriella madonensis zambiensis (Betrem, 1972)
Campsomeriella manokwariensis (Cameron, 1906)
Campsomeriella manokwariensis kraussi (Krombein, 1973)
Campsomeriella manokwariensis lanhami (Krombein, 1963)
Campsomeriella manokwariensis manni (Krombein, 1963)
Campsomeriella ornaticollis (Cameron, 1909)
Campsomeriella pseudocollaris (Betrem, 1972)
Campsomeriella rajasthanica (Gupta & Jonathan, 2003)
Campsomeriella rubromarginata (Betrem, 1972)
Campsomeriella sauteri (Beirem, 1928)
Campsomeriella sauteri berlandi (Beirem, 1928)
Campsomeriella thoracica (Fabricius, 1787)
Campsomeriella thoracica senilis (Fabricius, 1793)
Campsomeriella torquata (Betrem & Bradley, 1972)
Campsomeriella wetterensis (Betrem, 1928)

References 

Parasitic wasps
Hymenoptera genera
Scoliidae